Chewang is a town in Wudi County, in northern Shandong province, China. , it has one residential community and 76 villages under its administration.

See also 
 List of township-level divisions of Shandong

References 

Township-level divisions of Shandong